Thessaloniki Airport , officially Thessaloniki Airport "Makedonia" and formerly Mikra Airport, is an international airport serving Thessaloniki, the second-largest city in Greece.

The airport is the third-largest airport in the country after Athens International Airport and Heraklion International Airport. It opened in 1930 and was the second-busiest airport in Greece in terms of flights served and the third-busiest in terms of passengers served in 2016, with over 6 million passengers. It is the main airport of Northern Greece and apart from the city of Thessaloniki it also serves the popular tourist destination of Chalkidiki and the surrounding cities of Central Macedonia. The AthensThessaloniki route is the tenth busiest in the EU with 1.8 million passengers. To cope with demand, a second terminal was constructed in conjunction with Fraport and formally opened in 2021.

History
The airport was first established as an airfield during the First World War, as part of the allied war effort on the Macedonian front. There were numerous airfields at the time, including ,  (which became the current international airport), and the major military airfield of Sedes. The first international flight to Thessaloniki landed at the  air field, and government efforts at encouraging the growth of civil aviation saw the start of construction of a purpose-built civilian airport at the present location in 1938. Works were temporarily abandoned due to the Second World War and the airport opened to civilian traffic in 1948.

Major works were undertaken after the war. Damage to the tower caused by the 1978 Thessaloniki earthquake meant it needed to be torn down, and a new tower, still in operation, was built. Modernisation works were undertaken in the late 1990s, as part of the celebrations for Thessaloniki being European Capital of Culture in 1997. In 1993 the airport took the name  (Macedonia).

The operational aspects of the airport were privatised in 2015. Fraport AG/Copelouzos Group joint venture and the state privatisation fund agreed to the privatisation of the airport operations, and 13 other Greek airports, in December 2015. Fraport Greece will operate the airport for 40 years starting on 11 April 2017. It pledged to invest €400 million ($ million) on the various airports, including a refurbishment of the existing facilities at Thessaloniki as well as the construction of a second terminal. Construction on the new terminal began on 19 September 2018 and finished in February 2021, three months ahead of schedule. Refurbishment works other than the terminal included the installation of an upgraded baggage handling system, the construction of three additional baggage reclaim belts, the connection of the wastewater treatment plant to the municipal service, the construction of a new airport fire station, and the construction of two new access control gatehouses to the previously unguarded apron. Fraport expects passenger traffic to increase by 48% by 2026 as a result of its investment.

Facilities

General 
The airport consists of two terminals arranged in a T-shape, with the main access road on one side and the tarmac on the other, while the control tower is located in the junction between the two terminals. Four parking lots are located directly in front of the Terminal 1 building: the P4 lot is reserved for short term (visitor) parking and lots P6, P7 and P8 are used for long term (traveler) parking. P5, located on the left of the T1 building, serves taxi cabs and tourist buses.

Terminals 
The airport's original terminal (T1) consists of three floors. The ground floor serves arrivals only and is divided into two sections: international/extra-Schengen arrivals and domestic/intra-Schengen arrivals. The second floor serves departures and also includes a shopping center. On this floor there are 16 check-in counters, waiting areas, bars, stores and various airlines' offices. The third floor houses two restaurants and several bars with views to the runways, as well as two passenger lounges. T1 houses twelve departure gates (numbered 13-24) : gates 13 and 14 are for domestic or intra-Schengen flights, gates 15-18 are used interchangeably for either domestic, intra-Schengen or extra-Schengen flights, and gates 19-24 are reserved exclusively for extra-Schengen international flights. 

An additional terminal (T2) was opened in the beginning of 2021. It includes an additional 28 check in counters (bringing the airport total to 44), and twelve departure gates (numbered 01-12) for international (intra-Schengen) and domestic flights. This terminal also includes several additional duty-free shops, traditional souvenir and jewelry shops, and auxiliary airline offices. 

In both terminals, passengers can use the "Fraport-free" free Wi-Fi  and public mobile phone charging ports, as well as luggage carrying trolleys, and receive information from two National Tourism Organization offices. There are also ATM machines, postal service  and car rental offices  in the departure sections of both terminals.

There are two passenger waiting areas :

Aegean Passenger Lounge, reserved exclusively for Aegean Airlines passengers as well as Star Alliance Golden Members 
Manolis Andronicos Skyserv lounge

Runways and apron
The airport has two runways (10/28 and 16/34) and two taxiways. There are 22 stands for narrow-body aircraft and 20 for light aircraft.

A modernisation and expansion project for runway 10/28 began in 2005, with an initial completion date of 2011, but has since been delayed and was finally completed in March 2019. The runway entered service on 11 September 2020. Overall, the project took almost a quarter century to build, from inception in 1997, and it had an estimated cost of €179 million ($ million). The runway was extended by 1000 meters into the sea, with a total length of 3440 meters and was equipped with ILS. When the runway opened for commercial use it was able to accommodate 89.6% of current commercial aircraft types, as opposed to just 22.6% before the extension, and improved safety while landing in bad weather conditions and low visibility.

Fire station 
The airport is served by Thessaloniki Fire Station No 5, whose facility is located in the junction between runways 10/28 and 16/34.

Other facilities 
The Thessaloniki AeroClub recreational flying club maintains a hangar next to the T2 building which is used by its more experienced pilots (the club's actual hangar facilities are on the Kolchiko airport). The Aeolus pilot academy also operates on the airport.

Airlines and destinations
The following airlines operate regular scheduled and charter flights at Thessaloniki Airport:

Statistics

Overview

Between 1994 and 2010, Thessaloniki Airport saw a rise in passenger traffic equal to 76%, from 2.2 million in 1994 to 3.9 million in 2010. Between 2003 and 2008 the airport saw a passenger traffic increase of 19.1% from 3.5 million to almost 4.2 million passengers, an all-time high. The number of passengers dropped in next years. However, over the last two years the airport experienced passenger traffic increase to just above four million by 2013. Significant traffic increase took place during 2014, with the total number of passengers exceeding the five million mark for the first time.

Annual statistics

Busiest passenger routes by country 
The table below shows passenger totals at Thessaloniki International Airport by country destination during 2022.

Top airlines

Transport 

The airport is directly connected with the city's major road arteries in the southeast, the EO16 and the A25, which connects Thessaloniki with Chalkidiki, via the ΕΟ67. The Thessaloniki Inner Ring Road provides access to the A1/E75 and A2/E90 motorways. A total of 2,285 parking spaces for cars exist at the front of the terminal building. A car rental service is available at the terminal building. In addition, taxi services are available outside the airport terminal building 24 hours a day.

Public transport 
There are plans to connect the airport with the Thessaloniki Metro network, which is set to open in 2023 after delays. Attiko Metro, the company overseeing the project, has published a map of proposed extensions, and it includes an overground extension of Line 2 towards the airport. This extension is not an immediate concern for the company, however, since the terminus of Line 2, will be connected with the airport by a 10-minute shuttle bus. Detailed planning of the metro extension toward the airport was initiated in March 2019.

In the meantime, the airport is served on a 24-hour basis by bus 01X/01N of the Thessaloniki Urban Transport Organization (OASTH), which provides bus services between the Thessaloniki Bus Station (KTEL) and Makedonia airport arrivals/departures.

Accidents and incidents

On 12 August 1997, Olympic Airways Flight 171, a Boeing 727-230 registered as SX-CBI inbound from Athens Ellinikon Airport, touched down late and was steered off the runway to avoid overrunning into the sea. None of the 35 passengers and crew were killed, but the aircraft was damaged beyond repair.
On 17 December 1997, Aerosvit Flight 241, a Yakovlev Yak-42, operating the route from Odessa, Ukraine to Thessaloniki, lost contact with the airport's air traffic control and during the second attempt the aircraft crashed in the Pierian Mountains, near Mount Olympus. A total of 70 people, passengers and crew, 41 of which were Greeks, were killed.
On 4 July 2000, HA-LCR, a chartered Malév Flight 262 Tupolev Tu-154 landed on its belly. The crew had forgotten to lower the undercarriage and the plane skidded  on the runway. Thanks to the plane's robust construction and the engines' high position, the plane was able to become airborne again as the pilots applied full throttle. It circled while the crew lowered the undercarriage and landed safely. There were no injuries. It was considered uneconomical to repair the aircraft. The aircraft still remains on site, although airline markings have been obscured and it has been heavily depleted of re-usable spares.
On 15 June 2013, an AMC Airlines Boeing 737-800 on behalf of Astra Airlines Greece, registration SU-BPZ performing flight A2-921 from Novosibirsk (Russia) to Thessaloniki (Greece) with 160 passengers, landed on Thessaloniki's runway 16 at about 07:14L (04:14Z) but overran the end of the runway by about 110 meters/360 feet and came to a stop with all gear on soft ground. No injuries occurred, the aircraft received minor if any damage.

See also

List of the busiest airports in Greece
Transport in Greece

References

External links

Thessaloniki Airport Official Fraport website
Official government website
Greek Airports

Airports in Greece
1930 establishments in Greece
Transport in Thessaloniki
Transport infrastructure in Central Macedonia